Sir Frederick Ernest James  (10 September 1891 – 18 January 1971) was a British colonial administrator, businessman and Liberal Party politician.

Background
James was born in Nottingham, Nottinghamshire, the son of Rev. George Howard James of Letchworth, and his wife, Agnes Mary Blomfield. In 1919, he married Eleanor May Thackrah CBE. They had no children. He was awarded the Chevalier of the  Order of Léopold I and the OBE in 1919 and was knighted in 1941.

Career
James served in the European War from 1914–18. He was General Secretary of the YMCA in Calcutta India from 1920–28. He was a member of the Bengal Legislative Council from 1924–28. From 1928–41 he was political adviser to British interests in South India. He was a member of the All India Legislative Assembly from 1932–45. He was Liberal candidate for the new Sudbury & Woodbridge division of Suffolk at the 1950 General Election and came third; 

He did not stand for parliament again.

References

External links 
Sir Frederick Ernest James;  National Portrait Gallery

1891 births
1971 deaths
Liberal Party (UK) parliamentary candidates
Officers of the Order of the British Empire
Knights Bachelor
Politicians from Nottingham
20th-century English politicians
YMCA leaders